Earias paralella is a moth of the family Nolidae. It is known from Australia.

References

Nolidae
Moths described in 1898